This is a list of notable disc golfers.

Catrina Allen
Ken Climo (1968 - ) (US)Twelve - time PDGA World Champion 
James Conrad
Nate Doss
 Dave Dunipace
David Feldberg
Holly Finley
Ed Headrick
Sarah Hokom
John Houck
Avery Jenkins
Valarie Jenkins
Stancil Johnson
Jeremy Koling
Simon Lizotte
Nikko Locastro
Jack Lewis
Paul McBeth
Ruth Duncan
Kirsten Clary
Michael Suse
Eric McCabe
Eagle Wynne McMahon
Tom Monroe (1947 - ) (US) Hall of Fame and disc golf champion
Paige Pierce
Barry Schultz
Johnny Sias
Nathan Sexton
Scott Stokely
Kristin Tattar
Paul Ulibarri
Lloyd Weema
Ken Westerfield (1947 - ) (US/Can) Decade Awards, Hall of Fame. 
Ricky Wysocki

References

Players
List